Zenyōmitsu-ji (善養密寺) is a Buddhist temple in the Setagaya ward of Tokyo, Japan. The temple follows the Shingon creed of Vajrayana Buddhism, which attaches particular importance to the origins of Buddhism and its manifestation throughout history.

Zenyōmitsu-ji has a rich collection of authentic historical artifacts from India, Central Asia and China. Most notable is an exceptional collection of art from Gandhara, which was gathered over the course of twenty years by the head of the Temple.

Transportation 
The temple is about a 15-minute walk from Todoroki Station on the Tokyu Oimachi Line.

Works of art at Zenyōmitsu-ji

See also
 Gautama Buddha
 For an explanation of terms concerning Japanese Buddhism, Japanese Buddhist art, and Japanese Buddhist temple architecture, see the Glossary of Japanese Buddhism.

External links

Buddhist temples in Tokyo
Buildings and structures in Setagaya